Aliette de Bodard is a French-American speculative fiction writer.

Writing
de Bodard published her first short story in 2006. In 2007, she was a winner of Writers of the Future, and in 2009 was nominated for the John W. Campbell Award for Best New Writer. She has been published in Interzone, Hub magazine, Black Static, Andromeda Spaceways Inflight Magazine, Asimov's, Realms of Fantasy, Apex Magazine, among others.

She won the 2012 Nebula Award and Locus Award for Best Short Story for her short story "Immersion". She also won the 2013 Nebula Award for "The Waiting Stars". Her short story "The Shipmaker" won the 2010 British Science Fiction Award for Best Short Fiction. Her Xuya Universe novella The Tea Master and the Detective won the 2018 Nebula Award for Best Novella and the 2019 World Fantasy Award for Best Novella, and is nominated for the 2019 Hugo Award for Best Novella .

Her novelette "The Jaguar House, in Shadow" was nominated for both the Nebula and Hugo Awards. Her short story "Shipbirth" was also nominated for the Nebula. Her novella "On a Red Station, Drifting", released by Immersion Press in December 2012, was a finalist for the  Nebula and Hugo. The science fiction work chronicles the conflict between two members of an extended Vietnamese family on a space station ruled by an AI, and is part of Bodard's Asian-dominated alternate-history series.

Bodard's short story collection Scattered Among Strange Worlds was released in July, 2012. The collection features two science fiction stories entitled "Scattered Along the River of Heaven" and "Exodus Tides". Her short story "The Dust Queen" was published in the science fiction anthology Reach for Infinity in 2014.

Her novel The House of Shattered Wings, set in a devastated Paris ruled by fallen angels, was published by Gollancz/Roc in August 2015. It won the BSFA Award for Best Novel of 2015. Her story "Three Cups of Grief, by Starlight" won the BSFA Award for Best Short Story of 2015, the first time a single author has ever won both fiction categories in the same year.

Themes 
Many of her stories are set in alternate history worlds where Aztec or pre-communist Vietnamese cultures are dominant. In a 2018 interview with L'épaule d'Orion, she stated that "taste is largely underutilised sensorily in science-fiction... future worlds in SF have a tendency to be sanitised." In a 2021 interview with Locus, she stated that she tried to write "parent-child relationships, and very often a mother-daughter relationship, because that’s a thing you don’t often see, aside from the controlling mother and the estranged mother. You don’t even often see characters with dead mothers – the mothers tend to just fade out."

Personal life 
She is of French and Vietnamese descent, born in the US, and grew up in Paris. French is her mother-tongue, but she writes in English. A graduate of École Polytechnique, she works as a software engineer specialising in image processing and is a member of the Written in Blood writers group.

Bibliography

External links
 
 Written in Blood writers group
 
 Interview (excerpts) from Locus magazine, August 2013

References

Living people
21st-century American novelists
21st-century French novelists
American people of French descent
American science fiction writers
American women short story writers
American women novelists
American writers of Vietnamese descent
Asimov's Science Fiction people
French women novelists
French people of Vietnamese descent
Nebula Award winners
Women science fiction and fantasy writers
Writers from New York City
Writers from Paris
21st-century American women writers
21st-century American short story writers
Novelists from New York (state)
1982 births
21st-century French women